Friedrich Moritz "Fritz" Hartogs (20 May 1874 – 18 August 1943) was a German-Jewish mathematician, known for his work on set theory and foundational results on several complex variables.

Life 

Hartogs was the son of the merchant Gustav Hartogs and his wife Elise Feist and grew up in Frankfurt am Main.
He studied at the Königliche Technische Hochschule Hannover, at the Technische Hochschule Charlottenburg, at the University of Berlin, and at the Ludwig Maximilian University of Munich, graduating with a doctorate in 1903 (supervised by Alfred Pringsheim). He did his Habilitation in 1905 and was Privatdozent and Professor in Munich (from 1910 to 1927 extraordinary professor and since 1927 ordinary professor). 
As a Jew, he suffered greatly under the Nazi regime: he was fired in 1935, was mistreated and briefly interned in KZ Dachau in 1938, and eventually committed suicide in 1943.

Work 

Hartogs main work was in several complex variables where he is known for 
Hartogs's theorem, Hartogs's lemma (also known as Hartogs's principle or Hartogs's extension theorem) and the concepts of holomorphic hull and domain of holomorphy.

In set theory, he contributed to the theory of wellorders and proved what is also known as Hartogs's theorem: for every set x there is a wellordered set that cannot be injectively embedded in x.
The smallest such set is known as the Hartogs number or Hartogs Aleph of x.

References 
.
. Available at the DigiZeitschriften.
. Available at the DigiZeitschriften.

External links 

 Biography (in German)

1874 births
1943 suicides
19th-century German mathematicians
20th-century German mathematicians
Scientists from Brussels
Complex analysts
Mathematical analysts
German Jews who died in the Holocaust
Suicides by Jews during the Holocaust
Academic staff of the Ludwig Maximilian University of Munich